A wangler is someone who resorts to trickery.

Wangler may also refer to:

 John Wangler (born 1958), former American footballer
 Kenny Wangler, a character in the HBO drama Oz
 Martin Wangler (born 1969), German actor and cabaret artist
 Wangler da Silva (born 1992), Brazilian footballer

See also 
 Wängle, a village in Austria